Børge Enemark (17 August 1943 – 17 January 1996) was a Danish footballer. He played in eleven matches for the Denmark national football team from 1965 to 1969.

References

External links
 
 

1943 births
1996 deaths
Danish men's footballers
Denmark international footballers
People from Varde Municipality
Association football midfielders
Esbjerg fB players